Heckle and Jeckle are postwar animated cartoon characters created by Paul Terry, originally produced at his own Terrytoons animation studio and released through 20th Century Fox. The characters are a pair of identical anthropomorphic yellow-billed magpies; they were voiced at different times by Sid Raymond (1947), Ned Sparks (1947–51), Roy Halee (1951–61), Dayton Allen (1956–66) and Frank Welker (1979).

Production history 

The Talking Magpies, released January 4, 1946, was the first Terrytoons cartoon to feature a pair of wisecracking magpies. This was a husband-and-wife pair, not the pair of identical birds that they would become. Terry was taken with the idea of a pair of identical characters, and followed up with The Uninvited Pests (November 29, 1946), which established the pair as new characters. Terrytoons made 52 Heckle and Jeckle theatrical cartoons between 1946 and 1966. The early cartoons paired the duo with the popular song of the time, "Listen to the Mocking Bird", as their theme.

Television shows
After Paul Terry sold the Terrytoons studio to CBS in 1955, the studio's cartoons were repackaged in different timeslots. In summer 1956, the premiere episode of the primetime CBS Cartoon Theater included the 1947 magpie short Flying South.

The Heckle and Jeckle Cartoon Show premiered on CBS Saturday mornings on October 14, 1956, and aired until 1966. The show also included shorts starring other Terrytoons characters, including Mighty Mouse, Little Roquefort and Percy the Cat, Gandy Goose, Dinky Duck and the Terry Bears.

After a hiatus, the show moved to NBC Saturday mornings in September 1969, and aired until September 4, 1971.

The New Adventures of Mighty Mouse and Heckle & Jeckle premiered on CBS Saturday mornings on September 8, 1979. The show featured newly-animated 11-minute magpie cartoons, in which the characters were not as abrasive as their theatrical personas. The hour-long show featured two Heckle and Jeckle cartoons. The show was cut to a half-hour for the 1980-1981 season, and featured one Heckle and Jeckle cartoon.

Heckle and Jeckle made a cameo in the 1988 Mighty Mouse: The New Adventures episode "Mighty's Wedlock Whimsy", alongside a few other Terrytoons characters. However, they have no speaking lines.

In an unreleased 1999 Terrytoons pilot called Curbside, Heckle was voiced by Toby Huss and Jeckle was voiced by comedian Bobcat Goldthwait. They were also changed from magpies to crows.

Comic books and licensing 

Heckle and Jeckle have been licensed for toys, T-shirts, puzzles, games, salt and pepper shakers, Halloween costumes, plush dolls, puppets, coloring books, cookie jars and other consumer products for decades, variously through Terrytoons, CBS Television and Viacom. Selected cartoons from the original series of 52 theatrical titles were briefly made available on VHS home video in the 1990s, but a major DVD release has yet to materialize. The characters also regularly appeared in comic books over the years, including "Mighty Mouse", "Terrytoons" and "Paul Terry's Comics", and even headlined a number of their own comic book titles:

St. John Publications, Heckle and Jeckle #1–24 (1951–55)
Pines Comics, Heckle and Jeckle #25–34 (1956–59)
Dell Comics, New Terrytoons #6–8 (1962)
Gold Key Comics, New Terrytoons #1–43; 47 (1962–77)

Heckle and Jeckle were planned to have a cameo in the deleted scene "Acme's Funeral" from the 1988 film Who Framed Roger Rabbit.

Home video 
Aside from the public domain VHS tapes and DVDs there were a few authorized home video releases.

1978 Magnetic Video released VHS and Betamax tapes that included Heckle & Jeckle.
5 Terrytoon Cartoons Featuring Heckle & Jeckle included "Stowaways" along with 4 other Terrytoons.
5 Terrytoon Cartoons Featuring Mighty Mouse included "King Tut's Tomb" along with 4 other Terrytoons.

1981 RCA Selectavision CED discs (not laserdiscs).
Terrytoons Volume 1 featuring Mighty Mouse included "Wild Life" and "Miami Maniacs" along with 13 other Terrytoons.

1989 Video Treasures released VHS Tapes (at LP speed).
The Best of Terrytoons included "The Talking Magpies" along with 5 other Terrytoons.
Terrytoon Olympics included "Gooney Golfers" along with 5 other Terrytoons.
Heckle & Jeckle vol.1 featured "Magpie Madness", "Free Enterprise", "The Power of Thought", "The Stowaways", "Happy Landing".
Heckle & Jeckle vol.2 featured "The Intruders", "Flying South", "Fishing By The Sea", "The Super Salesmen", "The Hitch-Hikers", "A Sleepless Night".

No official laserdiscs, DVDs, or Blu-rays.

Filmography

 1946 
 The Talking Magpies (prototypes) (January 4)
 The Uninvited Pests (official debut) (November 29)

 1947 
 McDougal's Rest Farm (January 31) 
 Happy Go Lucky (February 28)
 Cat Trouble (April 11)
 The Intruders (May 9)
 Flying South (August 15)
 Fishing By the Sea (September 19)
 The Super Salesman (October 24)
 The Hitch Hikers (December 12)

 1948 
 Taming the Cat (January)
 A Sleepless Night (June)
 Magpie Madness (July)
 Out Again in Again (November)
 Free Enterprise (November)
 Goony Golfers (December)

 1949 
 The Power of Thought (January)
 The Lion Hunt (March)
 The Stowaways (April)
 Happy Landing (June)
 Hula Hula Land (July)
 Dancing Shoes (November)

 1950 
 The Fox Hunt (February)
 A Merry Chase (May)
 King Tut's Tomb (August)

 1951 
 Rival Romeos (January)
 Bulldozing the Bull (March)
 The Rainmakers (June)
 Steeple Jacks (September)
 'Sno Fun (November)

 1952 
 Movie Madness (January)
 Off to the Opera (May)
 House Busters (August)
 Moose on the Loose (November)

 1953 
 Hair Cut-Ups (February)
 Pill Peddlers (April)
 Ten Pin Terrors (June)
 Bargain Daze (August)
 Log Rollers (November)

 1954 
 Blind Date (February)
 Satisfied Customers (May)
 Blue Plate Symphony (December)

 1956 
 Miami Maniacs (February)

 1957 
 Pirate's Gold (January)

 1959 
 Wild Life (September)

 1960 
 Thousand Smile Checkup (January)
 Mint Men
 Trapeze, Pleeze
 Deep Sea Doodle
 Stunt Men

 1961 
 Sappy New Year

 1966 
 Messed Up Movie Makers

References 

Animated duos
Fictional anthropomorphic characters
Film characters introduced in 1946
Fictional corvids
Fictional tricksters
Magpies and treepies
NBC original programming
Terrytoons characters
Films adapted into comics
Male characters in animation